is a Japanese historian living in Hiroshima, Japan. He is known for his research into Allied prisoners of war who died during the air raids on Japan. His hug with U.S. President Barack Obama during the president's visit to Hiroshima gained world-wide attention.

World War II
Mori was a young boy in Hiroshima during World War II. When the city was destroyed with an atomic bomb on August 6, 1945, he was walking on a bridge and was thrown into a river. He saw a large number of badly wounded people who he was unable to help.

Postwar research

An atomic bomb survivor, Mori has spent over 30 years researching and obtaining official recognition for United States aviators who were killed while being held as POWs in the Chugoku Military Police Headquarters, approximately 400m from the explosion's hypocenter in Hiroshima.  He authored a book on the subject: A Secret History of U.S. Servicemembers Who Died in Atomic Bomb that has been translated to a web-based version in English. A documentary film, Paper Lanterns, tells the story of Mori's work over several decades to learn and share the fate of the Americans who were killed by the blast, fire, and radiation by the atomic bombing of Hiroshima.

For decades, Mori has been trying to locate relatives of airmen from one of the aircraft shot down during an air raid on Kure, from the B-24J bomber "Taloa." Wreckage from the downed aircraft that had been hidden by local farmers was handed over to Mori with the hope of being returned to surviving family members for closure.

Mori met and was embraced by US President Barack Obama during Obama's May 2016 visit to Hiroshima.

References

Living people
1937 births
20th-century Japanese historians